The 1957 Kansas Jayhawks football team represented the University of Kansas in the Big Seven Conference during the 1957 NCAA University Division football season. In their fourth and final season under head coach Chuck Mather, the Jayhawks compiled a 5–4–1 record (4–2 against conference opponents), finished second in the Big Seven Conference, and were outscored by all opponents by a combined total of 230 to 115. They played two ranked teams, losing to No. 2 Oklahoma by a 47–0 score and to No. 9 Oregon State by a 34–6 score. They played their home games at Memorial Stadium in Lawrence, Kansas.

The team's statistical leaders included Homer Floyd with 505 rushing yards and 189 receiving yards and Wally Strauch with 320 passing yards. Lynn McCarthy, Wally Strauch, and Bob Kraus were the team captains.

Schedule

References

Kansas
Kansas Jayhawks football seasons
Kansas Jayhawks football